Tinaki is a rural locality (a settlement) in Solyansky Selsoviet, Narimanovsky District, Astrakhan Oblast, Russia. The population was 102 as of 2010. There are 6 streets.

Geography 
It is located on the Tinaki Lake, 36 km south of Narimanov (the district's administrative centre) by road. Prigorodny is the nearest rural locality.

References 

Rural localities in Narimanovsky District